Russell Sage College (often Russell Sage or RSC) is a co-educational college with two campuses located in Albany and Troy, New York, approximately  north of New York City in the Capital District.  Russell Sage College offers both undergraduate and graduate degree and certificate programs. As of 2020, roughly 1,300 undergraduate students and 1,200 graduate students are enrolled.

History
RSC was founded in 1916 by Margaret Olivia Slocum Sage, a suffragist, as a "school of practical arts."  She named the college after her husband, Russell, who was an American financier, railroad executive and Congressman from New York. With Eliza Kellas, head of the Emma Willard School, Mrs. Sage was active in the women's suffrage movement; in founding the new college, they proposed to offer women the means of independence through the combination of broad education in the liberal arts with preparation for specific professional careers. Initially, the college operated under the charter of the Emma Willard School, granting its first baccalaureate degree in 1918 and graduating its first class in 1920. In 1927, the New York State Board of Regents granted a separate charter for Russell Sage College and reaffirmed the status of Emma Willard as a secondary school.

During World War II, an "emergency men's division" was created, and in 1942 the first graduate degree was conferred. In 1949, an Albany Division was opened, offering two-year, four-year and graduate degrees under the charter of Russell Sage College and extending the college's mission to include the education of men on the second campus. Sage Junior College of Albany received its own degree-granting powers in 1957. In 1995, Sage Graduate School became authorized to grant degrees independently, Sage Evening College became recognized as a separate administrative unit, and the institution was re-chartered by the Board of Regents of the state of New York as The Sage Colleges, often referred to for the sake of convenience as "Sage." The words Russell Sage College refer only to the college for women. In 2001, Sage Junior College of Albany and Sage Evening College were replaced by a single entity, Sage College of Albany.

With a charter change effective July 1, 2020 and beginning with that year's fall semester, Russell Sage College, Sage College of Albany, and Sage Graduate Schools united under a single name, also Russell Sage College, one college with two co-educational campuses in Albany and Troy, New York.

Academics
Majors offered at the college are:

Undergraduate
 Art & Extended Media (BFA)
 Biology (BA, BS)
 Business Administration (BBA, BS)
 Childhood Education (BS)
 Creative Arts in Therapy (BS)
 English (BA)
 Graphic & Media Design (BFA)
 Health Sciences (BS)
 History (BA)
 Interior & Spatial Design (BFA)
 Interdisciplinary Studies (BA, BS)
 Law & Society (BS)
 Legal Studies (Certificate)
 Musical Theatre (BS)
 Nursing, pre-licensure (BS)
 Nursing (RN-BS)
 Nutrition Science (BS)
 Organizational Studies (BPS)
 Physical Education (BS)
 Pre-Medical Studies Post-Baccalaureate (Certificate)
 Psychology (BS)
 Public Health (BS)
 Sociology (BA)
 Sport & Recreation Management (BS)
 Theatre (BA)
 Writing & Contemporary Thought (BS)

Graduate
 Adult Gerontology Nurse Practitioner (MS)
 Applied Behavior Analysis and Autism (MS)
 Applied Nutrition (MS)
 Childhood/Literacy Education (MS)
 Childhood/Special Education (MS)
 Community Psychology (MA)
 Counseling and Community Psychology (MA)
 Educational Leadership (Ed.D.)
 Family Nurse Practitioner (MS)
 Family Psychiatric Mental Health Nurse Practitioner (MS)
 Forensic Mental Health (MS)
 Health Services Administration (MS)
 Literacy Education (MS)
 Literacy/Special Education (MS)
 Master of Business Administration (MBA)
 Nutrition & Dietetics (MS)
 Occupational Therapy (MS)
 Organization Management (MS)
 Physical Therapy (DPT)
 Professional School Counseling (MS)
 Professional School Counseling - Advanced Study (Certificate)
 School Health Education (MS)

Campus

The self-contained  campus is located in the historic district of Troy, New York with 19th-century brownstone residences, Victorian gates, formal courtyards and walled gardens. This campus is on two blocks and is a safe campus with no recent reported crime in the area. There is a bowling lane, numerous antique and jewelry stores, a public library nearby, and several independent coffee shops in the area. There is easy access to public transportation for students to get around.

The campus was home to the New York State Theatre Institute (NYSTI), which utilized the Schacht Fine Arts Center. Due to a lack of state funding, NYSTI shut down at the end of 2010, and the college has filled its role with the new Theatre Institute at Sage.

Residence halls and houses

Several of the brownstones are now used for student housing in place of traditional dormitories.

Two international houses, French House and Spanish House, are for students studying or speaking those languages. It requires an application process that you are either majoring in either one of those languages or are taking a course in either language to live in it. It is suggested you have a 3.0 gpa to be selected. German House was once counted among these but currently no longer requires that the students speak the language. This dorm is mostly filled with some juniors and seniors with one or two sophomores.

Wool House is for students in the honors program. In order to apply to live in Wool House, you must have a GPA of 3.0 or higher, community service credits, and participate in campus activities. Applications are accepted based on qualifications and then seniority since there are limited housing options within Wool House.

Other dorm houses include McMurray, Spicer and Gale. These three are combined as one dorm and are collectively referred to as MSG. The front main sitting room was restored in the early 1990s for the filming of The Age of Innocence. These dorms are named for the people who formerly owned them.

First-year students live in the Kellas and Slocum Halls. The lounges in these were restored with new furniture and plasma screen TVs in 2008. In the fall 2008 and the spring of 2009, the third floor of Kellas was opened to upperclassmen who wished to reside in the hall. In the fall of 2009, Kellas is expected to be first-years only and Slocum is expected to open its door for the first time in a few years.

McKinstry Hall is located above the McKinstry dining hall. These are also first-year dorms but like Slocum Hall, but due to financial reasons and small amount of enrollment they have not been lived in for quite a few years. They are used occasionally throughout the year for special activities and events. Slocum usually house transfer students just like Sage Hall does.

Upperclassman halls include Sage Hall, Manning Hall, and Rickets Hall. Sage Hall, featuring an elevator and back door that opens into Buchman, formerly housed the Troy Female Seminary, which is the only dormitory without a kitchen in the basement. Manning Hall is mostly graduates and seniors and single rooms. This (Manning) dorm features an elevator and air conditioning and also houses one of the Resident Director apartments. Rickets is only for graduate students but if there are more graduate students living on campus than expected then they are most likely housed in Manning Hall. Please note students can also live off campus.

Student life
There are a variety of student organizations available, such as Phi Kappa Phi and other honor societies, the Quill student newspaper, The Sagettes a cappella group and the Review literary magazine, and an assortment of cultural, religious, academic, arts, and sports groups.

Traditions
Russell Sage College has a rich history of student traditions, the most notable of which is the rotation of class colors. Even class years are assigned either the title of Golden Horseshoes or Purple Cows, while odd class years are assigned either the title of Blue Angels or Red Devils. After a senior class graduates in May, the incoming first-year class is assigned that color in September.

Other traditions include:

Big Sisters/Little Sisters: When a first-year student enters RSC, she is assigned a big sister in the junior class.
Banner Night: Before the first-year class arrives on campus, their big sister class will create a banner in the color of their class with their class year on it. This banner is presented to the first-year class on Banner Night.
Color Night: First-year class officers are announced on color night. The title of the night is changed every year based on the color of the first-year class (i.e. Gold Night, Blue Night, etc.)
Class Sweaters: First-year students order sweaters in the fall, which are delivered to them at the beginning of Rally (see below). The sweaters are the color of their class and bear the crest of the college as well as their class year on the left breast.
Class Dinners: Each class holds a formal dinner once per academic year.
Ring Dinner: The junior class dinner, traditionally held in the fall semester, is when students receive their class rings.
Rally: Raises money for community charities in a friendly competition. Rally is supervised by the senior class.
Rally Day: The last day of Rally.
Sweater Night: First-year students are allowed to wear their sweaters for the first time at the stroke of midnight.
Room Trashing: Big Sisters attempt to find her little sister's class sweater. If they find their sister's sweater, they steal it—the big sister will hold on to it and wear it around her waist at Rally events.
Class Day: At the annual spring moving-up ceremony held at the end of the school year before finals start, all classes "graduate" to their next year of college.

Athletics
In addition to club and intramural teams, Russell Sage is home to the Gators. Sage competes in the NCAA's Division III Empire 8 Conference. Russell Sage College currently offers 17 athletic teams and is adding 3 new teams in the 2021–2022 academic school year. Those new teams include baseball, women's golf, and eSports.

Notable people

Alumnae
 Elizabeth Anne Allen, retired actress
 Ann Caracristi, cryptanalyst and former Deputy Director of the National Security Agency
 Prudence Bushnell, diplomat
 Ginny Brown-Waite, U.S. Representative
 Mary Donohue, judge and former lieutenant governor of New York
 Mireya Robles, writer and literary critic

Alumnus
 Francis Terry McNamara, diplomat
 Marcus Patterson (basketball)

Faculty and staff
 Eric Wollencott Barnes, diplomat and former chair of the English department
 Robert O. Fink, renowned papyrologist and Classicist
 Eliza Kellas, renowned female educator and co-founder of Russell Sage
 Dean P. Taylor, politician and Russell Sage trustee

Honorary degrees
 Dorothy Lavinia Brown, early African-American surgeon and politician
 Joan Ganz Cooney, businesswoman and television producer
 Edna F. Kelly, Congresswoman
 Francis Terry McNamara, diplomat
 Anita Roddick, Dame Commander of the Order of the British Empire and founder of The Body Shop
 Nancy Roman, astronomer
 Eleanor Roosevelt, First Lady (recipient of the first honorary degree from RSC)
 Roland W. Schmitt, businessman
Hamdi Ulukaya, founder & CEO of Chobani
 Sonia Sotomayor, United States Supreme Court Justice

References

External links

 Russell Sage College
 Russell Sage Athletics

Schools in Troy, New York
The Sage Colleges
Universities and colleges in Albany County, New York
Private universities and colleges in New York (state)
Former women's universities and colleges in the United States
Education in Albany, New York
Educational institutions established in 1916
1916 establishments in New York (state)